Long Beach, California, is composed of many different neighborhoods. Some neighborhoods are named after thoroughfares, while others are named for nearby parks, schools, or city features.

Officially recognized neighborhoods

[

Other neighborhoods

 North Alamitos Beach (NABA)
 AOC7: Anaheim, Orange, Cherry and 7th Street
 Artcraft Manor
 Bixby Highlands
 Bixby Terrace
 Broadway Corridor
 Downtown Shoreline
 Eastside
 Cambodia Town (Little Phnom Penh)
 Long Beach Marina
 MacArthur Park Community of Long Beach
 "Nihonmachi" (East-Central)
 North Long Beach
 Poly High
 Promenade
 Ridgewood Heights
 Shoreline Village
 South of Conant
 Terminal Island
 Wrigley Heights

References

Geography of Long Beach, California